Theresa Tona (born 21 January 1991) is a taekwondo practitioner from Papua New Guinea. She competed in the 2008 and 2012 Summer Olympics.

References

External links

Taekwondo practitioners at the 2008 Summer Olympics
Taekwondo practitioners at the 2012 Summer Olympics
1991 births
Papua New Guinean female taekwondo practitioners
Olympic taekwondo practitioners of Papua New Guinea
Living people